Christmas is an unincorporated area and census-designated place in Orange County, Florida, United States. It is part of the Orlando–Kissimmee Metropolitan Statistical Area.

The population was 1,146 at the 2010 census. Every year, Christmas sends a large amount of mail from its post office from people who mail letters from the town so they can have the "Christmas" postmark on their holiday mailings.

Christmas is the birthplace of the American sculptor James Hughlette "Tex" Wheeler, who is best known for his bronze sculpture of the famed racehorse Seabiscuit which holds a place of honor at Santa Anita Park racetrack in California and his "tribute to the American folk humorist, Will Rogers at Claremore, Oklahoma". Wheeler is buried in the Fort Christmas Cemetery. 

Christmas is home to many Orlando digital TV stations' transmission towers.

History
On December 25, 1837, a force of 2,000 U.S. Army soldiers and Alabama Volunteers arrived in the area to construct a fort, which they named Fort Christmas. The fort was one of over 200 forts built during the Second Seminole War. In 1892, a Post Office opened at Christmas.

Geography
Christmas is located at  (28.5324, -80.9940).

Popular culture
Christmas is one of the many settings in John Green's 2008 novel Paper Towns. In the book, three Orlando high school students embark on a journey to find their friend, who has recently gone missing. An old abandoned mini-mall in Christmas is one of the places where they search for her and find clues vital to her case.

Demographics

As of the census of 2010, there were 1,146 people (down from 1,162 in the 2000 Census), 422 households (up from 420 in the 2000 Census), and 304 families (the same as in the 2000 Census) residing in the Christmas CDP (Census Designated Place).

As of the 2000 Census, the population density was 125.7/km (325.3/mi²).  There were 446 housing units at an average density of 48.2/km (124.9/mi²).  The racial makeup of the Christmas CDP was 95.44% White, 0.43% African American, 0.69% Native American, 0.95% Asian, 0.60% from other races, and 1.89% from two or more races. Hispanic or Latino of any race were 2.15% of the population.

As of 2010 there were 422 households, of which 34.8% had children under the age of 18 (up from 30.5% in the 2000 census) living with them, 50.5% were married couples living together (up from 49.5% in 2000), 12.1% had a female householder with no male present (down from 14.0% in the 2000 Census), 9.5% had a male householder with no female present (data from the 2000 Census is not available) and 28% were non-families (up from 27.6% in 2000). 25.4% of the households had individuals 65 years of age or older (a dramatic increase from the 8.3% in 2000).  The average household size was 2.72 (2.77 in 2000) and the average family size was 2.99 (down from 3.08 in 2000).

In the Christmas Census Designated Place (CDP), as of the 2010 Census, the median age was 41 years old (up from 37 years old in the 2000 Census). In 2010, 46.9% of the residents of the Christmas CDP were women and 53.1% were males.

The median income for a household in the Christmas CDP was not available for the 2010 Census.

Panoramic view

References

External links

Ft. Christmas Historical Park
World's Largest Alligator

Unincorporated communities in Orange County, Florida
Census-designated places in Orange County, Florida
Greater Orlando
Census-designated places in Florida
Unincorporated communities in Florida